Dáyâng ásu (in Pampangan) or dugong aso (in Tagalog) is a pejorative term meaning "sons of bitches", and  may refer to:
 the Pampangan political-economic elite during the Philippine Revolution;
 the Macabebe Scouts deployed during the Philippine–American War;
 Dugong Aso: Mabuting Kaibigan, Masamang Kaaway, a 2001 Philippine film;
 Dáyâng Ásu (2015), a political-noir film.

Language and nationality disambiguation pages
Class-related slurs